Sann Win is a Burmese head coach of Chin United, Myanmar National League.

International career
He is now the head coach for the Myanmar national football team. He was a former Myanmar Football Player.

Notes

Year of birth missing (living people)
Living people
Myanmar national football team managers
Burmese football managers
Burmese footballers
Footballers at the 1994 Asian Games
Asian Games competitors for Myanmar
Association footballers not categorized by position